Omri was a biblical King of Israel.

Omri, OMRI, Omry, or similar can mean:

People
Omri Afek (born 1979), Israeli footballer 
Omri Altman (born 1994), Israeli footballer
Omri Amrany (born 1954), Israeli-American sculptor and painter
Omri Ben Harush (born 1990), Israeli professional footballer 
Omri Casspi (born 1988), Israeli professional NBA basketball player
Omri Ceren, political blogger
Omri Katz (born 1976), American actor 
Omri Kende (born 1986), Israeli footballer
Omri Lowther (born 1983), Canadian-American boxer 
Omri Marcus (born 1979), comedy writer and creative director
Omri Nave (born 1988), Israeli footballer 
Omry Ronen (1937-2012), American Slavist 
Omri Sharon (born 1964), Israeli politician

Other
House of Omri refers to Omri and his descendants (particularly Ahab)
Omri, Iran, village in Iran
Omri, a major character in The Indian in the Cupboard series
Order of Merit of the Italian Republic
Organic Materials Review Institute, see